William Marchant (May 1, 1923 in Allentown, Pennsylvania – November 5, 1995 in Paramus, New Jersey) was a playwright and screenwriter. He is best known for writing the play that served as the basis for the 1957 Walter Lang movie, The Desk Set.

Marchant had been a resident of the Actor's Fund home in Englewood, New Jersey at the time of his death. He had earlier lived in the Stanton section of Readington Township, New Jersey, in a home owned by Broadway actress Dorothy Stickney.

Education
Marchant was born in Allentown, Pennsylvania and attended Temple University in Philadelphia and Yale School of Drama in New Haven, Connecticut.

Career

Playwriting
Marchant's play, To Be Continued, which included a 23-year-old Grace Kelly in the cast, opened on April 23, 1952 at the Booth Theatre on Broadway and ran for 13 performances.

Marchant's The Desk Set opened on Broadway on October 24, 1955 at the Broadhurst Theatre and ran for 296 performances with Shirley Booth in the lead role.  The play served as the source material for an eponymous 1957 movie starring Spencer Tracy and Katharine Hepburn.

In 1975, Marchant wrote The Privilege of his Company, a remembrance of Noël Coward, which was published by Bobbs-Merrill Company.

He translated the French play Les Dames Du Jeudi for Lynn Redgrave and John Clark, who premiered it as Thursday's Girls in Los Angeles in 1982.

Screenwriting

As a screenwriter, Marchant wrote several episodes for the Armchair Theatre and Armchair Mystery Theatre, dramatized Louise, a W. Somerset Maugham story, for a 1969 BBC Two television  production, and worked on two films, Triple Cross (1966) and My Lover, My Son.

References

External links

1923 births
1995 deaths
20th-century American dramatists and playwrights
20th-century American screenwriters
20th-century American male writers
American male dramatists and playwrights
American male screenwriters
People from Englewood, New Jersey
People from Readington Township, New Jersey
Screenwriters from New Jersey
Screenwriters from Pennsylvania
Temple University alumni
Yale School of Drama alumni
Writers from Allentown, Pennsylvania